Robert W. Cort (born January 13, 1951) is an American film producer. Since 1985 he has produced forty-eight feature films which have grossed more than $2.5 billion in worldwide box office. These include: On the Basis of Sex, Three Men and a Baby, Cocktail, Jumanji, Bill & Ted's Excellent Adventure, Revenge of the Nerds II: Nerds in Paradise, The Cutting Edge, Against the Ropes, Runaway Bride, and Save the Last Dance.

Cort also produced Mr. Holland's Opus and currently serves on the board of directors for The Mr. Holland's Opus Foundation

Cort’s HBO film, Something the Lord Made, won three Emmy Awards, including the 2004 Outstanding Film Made for Television. The film also won the American Film Institute Award, the Director's and Writer's Guild Awards, the Christopher, NAACP Image Award and the prestigious Peabody Award. His other television films have also won multiple honors, including the 1990 Emmy for Outstanding Children's Program for A Mother's Courage: The Mary Thomas Story.

His production of the family drama Im Winter ein Jahr (English Title:   A Year Ago in Winter), won the Silver Lola for Best Picture at the 2009 German Academy Awards.

Career history
Cort entered the motion picture industry in 1976 and one year later was named vice president of advertising, publicity and promotion for Columbia Pictures. In 1980, he became executive vice president of marketing for Fox. In his five years as a marketing chief, Cort planned and supervised the campaigns of such films as Close Encounters of the Third Kind, Midnight Express, The China Syndrome, All That Jazz, The Empire Strikes Back and Nine to Five. He then served as executive vice president of production at Twentieth Century Fox, where he oversaw the making of Romancing the Stone, Bachelor Party, and Revenge of the Nerds.

For the next eleven years, Cort was a partner and president of Interscope Communications. From 1996 to 2001, he was the managing partner with David Madden of The Cort/Madden Company, a production unit with close ties to Paramount Pictures. He currently operates Robert Cort Productions, an independent production company.

Cort was a partner and president of Interscope Communications.

From 1996 to 2001, Cort was the managing partner of The Cort/Madden Company, a production unit with close ties to Paramount Pictures.

In 2003 Random House published Cort's novel, Action!, which garnered positive critical reviews and became a bestseller.

His articles and essays have been published in The New York Times and The New Yorker. and he is currently a professor of production on the faculty of the American Film Institute.

Prior to working in the entertainment industry, Cort earned BA and MA degrees in history from the University of Pennsylvania and an MBA from the Wharton School, and was a management consultant for McKinsey & Company.

He lives in Beverly Hills, California, with his wife, Rosalie Swedlin, a manager of writers and directors.

Filmography
He was a producer in all films unless otherwise noted.

Film

Thanks

Television

References

External links
 

American film producers
Living people
1951 births